Tivon Pennicott is an American composer, orchestrator and tenor saxophonist.

Of Jamaican parentage, he grew up in Marietta, Georgia, but moved to Miami, Florida, where he studied music at the University of Miami. On a visit in Los Angeles, he met and was invited to perform with Kenny Burrell, who was a major influence on him. He ultimately recorded on Kenny Burrell's record "Be Yourself", recorded live in Jazz at Lincoln Center at Dizzy's Club Coca Cola on September 9, 2008. Pennicott then moved to New York City in late 2009, where he formed the Sound Quartet with pianist Mike Battaglia, bassist Spencer Murphy, and drummer Kenneth Salters. These members are featured on his debut album Lover of Nature, which was released in November 2014.

Pennicott most recently released his sophomore recording in the fall of 2020, Spirit Garden (New Phrase Records), having produced, orchestrated, composed and performed with and a for a 26 piece string orchestra alongside several combinations of a chord-less quartet. Joe Saylor, Philip Dizack, Yasushi Nakamura, Dominique Sanders, Olivier Glissant and Yoojin Park are key contributors to the record.

The album was recorded to tape at Studio G Brooklyn and Hurley NY's Dreamland Recording Studios. It was mixed by Russell Elevado and mastered by Alex DeTurk

As of September 2021 he has been a contributor to three Grammies, one with Esperanza Spalding and two with Gregory Porter. He is also the 2nd-place winner of the Thelonious Monk Institute of Jazz competition held in 2013.

Since early 2016 he has been performing full-time with Gregory Porter, also as he continues his artist-in-residence at the Annual Charlie Parker Celebration in Kansas City, Missouri.

References

External links
Official site

American jazz tenor saxophonists
Living people
Musicians from Marietta, Georgia
The Lovett School alumni
Year of birth missing (living people)